Angela Lutz is a former Swiss female curler.

Teams

References

External links

Living people

Swiss female curlers
Swiss curling champions
Year of birth missing (living people)